Ahmad Ibrahim, Ahmed Ibrahim or Ahmed Brahim may refer to:

 Ahmed Brahim (Tunisian politician) (1946–2016), Tunisian politician
 Ahmed Brahim (al-Qaeda) (born 1945), Algerian terrorist
 Ahmed Ibrahim (Cupid Cabbie), Egyptian-American taxicab driver
 Ahmad Ibrahim (Singaporean politician) (1927–1962), Singaporean politician
 Ahmad Ibrahim (basketball) (born 1992), Lebanese basketball player
 Ahmed Ibrahim (field hockey) (born 1978), Egyptian Olympic hockey player
 Ahmed Ibrahim (rower) (born 1938), Egyptian Olympic rower
 Ahmed Ibrahim (wrestler) (born 1971), Egyptian Olympic wrestler
 Ahmad Mohamed Ibrahim (1916–1999), Singaporean lawyer, law professor and Attorney-General of Singapore
 Ibrahim Ahmad (1914–2000), Kurdish writer and politician
 Ahmed Ibrahim (Ghanaian politician) (born 1974), Ghanaian politician
 Ahmed Halim Ibrahim (1910–?), Egyptian football midfielder 
 Ahmed M. Ibrahim, Egyptian football player
 Ahmed Osman Ibrahim, Somali politician
Furthermore, Ahmed Ibrahim are the first names of:
 Ahmed Ibrahim al-Haznawi, September 11 hijacker, 1980–2001
 Ahmed Ibrahim Al-Mughassil (born 1967), Saudi Hizbollah terrorist
 Ahmed Ibrahim Artan, Somali diplomat
 Ahmed Ibrahim Baday, Moroccan long-distance runner, born 1974
 Ahmad Ibrahim Khalaf, Iraqi association footballer, born 1992
 Ahmed Ibrahim Lawan, Nigerian politician
 Ahmed Ibrahim Warsama (born 1966), Qatari long-distance runner